Robert Stephen Bulch (1 January 1933 – 8 May 2012) was an English footballer who made 71 appearances in the Football League playing as a wing half for Notts County and Darlington in the 1950s. He was picked up by Notts County when his RAF Syerston side played them in a friendly. After he was de-mobbed from his national service on 15 March 1953, he was signed up by the Magpies. He also played non-league football for clubs including Washington and Hartlepool United.

In an autobiographical article written by Bobby Bulch himself it is written: 

“I was signed at a rate of £7 a week and £20 per week when I played First Team football. We were not given a BMW to use, and I remember the hassle of crossing London by tube train to get to the stadium of Chelsea, where among other chores I cleaned Roy Bentley's boots. Mind you, when I was at Nottingham Tony Hatley cleaned MY boots.”

"Football remained my chosen sport, and when in the R.A.F. I played for both camp and command teams. One of our matches was away against Notts County Colts in a Cup Tie. After the game the Notts County coach invited me to play for the team and I made several appearances for both Colts and their reserve team that season.

On demob from the R.A.F. I signed as a professional player and stayed with them until 1958. During my time with Notts County I had been in a successful Midland League side winning the league in 1954/5. I also played in the 1955/6 and 56/57 teams. I enjoyed my football in the first team, before leaving in 1958.

I was then transferred to Darlington FC and I was with them for two seasons. The next season saw me with Hartlepool United but by then I just could not compete at that level any longer, having sustained a serious knee injury that stayed with me from my Darlington days. I then retired from football.”

When talking about his later life, he said, “Sport has always been my main interest. Football, Golfing (9 handicap) and Snooker. Football, but only as a viewer in recent years. Golf is still an interest even after having held a 9 handicap for nearly twenty years, snooker in recent times because it was a far less strenuous activity. I also enjoy gardening, fitting the necessary housework in between, as my wife still works for a living, and of course watching T.V. with my grandchildren".

Bobby's family later made this article freely available to the people of Washington and was reproduced verbatim.

References

1933 births
People from Washington, Tyne and Wear
Footballers from Tyne and Wear
2012 deaths
English footballers
Association football wing halves
Chelsea F.C. players
Washington F.C. players
Notts County F.C. players
Darlington F.C. players
Ashington A.F.C. players
English Football League players